Mangas Springs is a populated place in Grant County, New Mexico, United States, named for the springs found at that location.

History
The Mangas Springs were originally named the Santa Lucia Springs, and was a favored haunt of the Ne-be-ke-yen-de local group of the Chííhénee’ band of the Chiricahua who once lived in the area and of Mangas Coloradas, for whom the springs are now named.

References

Unincorporated communities in Grant County, New Mexico
Unincorporated communities in New Mexico